The 1968 Magyar Kupa (English: Hungarian Cup) was the 29th season of Hungary's annual knock-out cup football competition.

Final

See also
 1968 Nemzeti Bajnokság I

References

External links
 Official site 
 soccerway.com

1968–69 in Hungarian football
1968–69 domestic association football cups
1968